Ziese is a river of Mecklenburg-Vorpommern, Germany. It forms a pseudobifurcation: its water west of Rappenhagen flows into the Dänische Wiek near Greifswald, and its water east of Rappenhagen flows into the Peenestrom near Wolgast.

See also
List of rivers of Mecklenburg-Vorpommern

Rivers of Mecklenburg-Western Pomerania
Rivers of Germany